Peter Michalovič (born ) is a Slovak male volleyball player. He is part of the Slovakia men's national volleyball team. On club level he plays for Pallavolo Ortona.

References

External links
 profile at FIVB.org

1990 births
Living people
Slovak men's volleyball players
Sportspeople from Malacky